Edmund Isham may refer to:
 Edmund Isham (academic administrator), vice-chancellor of Oxford University
 Sir Edmund Isham, 6th Baronet, British politician